Carlo Marenco (1800–1846) was an Italian dramatist.

Life

Marenco was born in Cassolnuovo, Lombardy.  After studying law me devoted himself to writing. In order to generate income, Marenco applied for and obtained a public post connected with the Treasury Department of Savona. He died at Savona.

Works

As a writer, Carlo Marenco belongs to the Romantic school with an elegant style and sentimental tragedies. He rejected the unity of time in his plays which adds to the ample plot development and characters being considered to be as lifelike as possible.

For some of his tragedies he derived inspiration from Dante, as in the "Pia de' Tolomei", the "Corso Donati", and the "Conte Ugolino". In the "Pia" there are traits of the Roman Lucretia and Susannah of the Bible, combined with characteristics of a Dante-esque figure.

Other plays bearing upon more or less historical personages include "Arnoldo da Brescia", "Berengario", "Arrigo di Svevia", and "Corradino".

References

Attribution
 The entry cites:
Tragedie (Turin, 1837–44)
Tragedie inedite (Florence, 1856)

External links
 

1800 births
1846 deaths
Italian dramatists and playwrights
19th-century Italian dramatists and playwrights
19th-century male writers